Stanley Phillip Gold (born September 10, 1942) is the former president and CEO of Shamrock Holdings, Roy E. Disney's private investment company, from 1985 to 2013, and is currently serving as chairman of its board of directors. He was on the Walt Disney Company board, in 1984 and during 1987–2003. He and Roy resigned to publicly campaign for the ousting of then-CEO and chairman Michael Eisner. He had also helped to both oust former CEO Ron W. Miller, and hire Eisner, in 1984.
He is a past chairman of the USC board of trustees, and of the University of Southern California Law School, and has been a significant political contributor.

Early life and education
Gold was born  to a Jewish family in Los Angeles, California. He grew up in South Los Angeles, near Dorsey High School. The family moved to the San Fernando Valley when he was a teenager. After graduation from Van Nuys High School, he entered University of California, Berkeley. There, he dated his future wife, Ilene. He completed an A.B. in political science at U.C.L.A. and, in 1967, earned a law degree at University of Southern California, then completed post-graduate work at Cambridge University, England.

Career

He practiced law, with Martin Gang, at Gang, Tyre, Ramer & Brown law firm, from 1968, later becoming its managing partner. He specialized in corporate acquisitions, sales and financing.

He has served as president of Shamrock Broadcasting; president, then chairman, of Central Soya; chairman of Enterra Corporation, chairman of Israeli investment firm Koor Industries Ltd., and chairman of Tadiran, among other positions.

Philanthropy
At a banquet honoring U.S. Ambassador John Marshall Evans, on 4 March 2007; Gold pledged $100,000 to the USC Institute of Armenian Studies. In 2001, he pledged $500,000 to establish the Martin Gang Scholarship Fund at Hebrew Union College; Roy and Patty Disney pledged an additional $100,000.

Gold was a fund raiser and donor for Ehud Barak's successful campaign in the 1999 Israeli prime ministerial election.

Gold has been a contributor to American federal political campaigns for many years, largely contributing to Democrats, both candidates and organizations, such as the (Democratic Congressional Campaign Committee, Democratic Senatorial Campaign Committee, and Democratic National Committee); Gold has also donated to some Republican party candidates, including George W. Bush, Robert Dole, Richard Lugar, Mitt Romney, Arlen Specter, William Weld, and Pete Wilson). OpenSecrets reported donations of $238,000 during 1993 to 17 December 2008, including a few non-federal contributions.

He is a supporter of the Two-state solution in the Middle East. In April 2013, Gold was one of 100 prominent American Jews who sent a letter to Israeli Prime Minister Benjamin Netanyahu, urging him to "work closely" with Secretary of State John Kerry, "to devise pragmatic initiatives, consistent with Israel's security needs, which would represent Israel's readiness to make painful territorial sacrifices for the sake of peace."

Memberships
 Sigma Alpha Mu
 Wilshire Boulevard Temple, past board member
 University of Southern California, chairman of the board of trustees; mentor to university president, Steven B. Sample

Personal life
Among the artifacts displayed in his study at home are personalized autographs from both Babe Ruth and Stan Musial.  He collects Porsche automobiles.

References

External links
Shamrock's Stanley Gold bio
SEC's bio of Stanley Gold
Forbes.com profile of Stanley P. Gold
Business Week profile

1942 births
Living people
Jewish American philanthropists
American chief executives of financial services companies
Businesspeople from Los Angeles
People from Beverly Hills, California
California Democrats
California lawyers
Van Nuys High School alumni
People from the San Fernando Valley
University of California, Berkeley alumni
USC Gould School of Law alumni
Alumni of the University of Cambridge
University of California, Los Angeles alumni
21st-century American Jews